Kłajpeda is a Polish toponymic derived from the Lithuanian Klaipėda. It may refer to:
 Klaipėda, a port city in Lithuania
 Kłajpeda, Podlaskie Voivodeship, a village in Poland